Pachydyta is a genus of moths belonging to the family Tineidae. It contains only one species, Pachydyta clitozona, which is found in Brazil and French Guiana.

References

Tineidae
Monotypic moth genera
Moths of South America
Tineidae genera
Taxa named by Edward Meyrick